is a former Japanese football player for Veertien Mie.

Playing career
Masaki Tanaka played for J2 League club; Giravanz Kitakyushu from 2013 to 2014.

Club statistics
Updated to 20 February 2016.

References

External links

1991 births
Living people
Nippon Sport Science University alumni
Association football people from Chiba Prefecture
Japanese footballers
J2 League players
Japan Football League players
Giravanz Kitakyushu players
Veertien Mie players
Association football defenders